Dalil Benyahia (born 21 April 1990 in Stockholm, Sweden) is a former Algerian-Swedish footballer who last played for IK Sirius.

Career
Benyahia was born in Stockholm, Sweden.

In 2004, Benyahia was chosen as the player of the tournament at the Nike Cup in Sweden and represented the country in a week-long high performance training session at Manchester United. In 2006, he was given a one-week trial by Chelsea FC. The following year, he also received a 10-day trial with Ajax Amsterdam.

On 14 July 2008, Benyahia signed a 3-year contract with Vejle BK after impressing on trial. He returned to IF Brommapojkarna in 2009, and was released in 2011.

On 2 August 2012, after some time as a free agent, Benyahia was reunited with former Brommapojkarna coach Kim Bergstrand, signing a -year contract with IK Sirius.

He retired from professional football after the 2014 season.

International career
On 29 September 2010, Benyahia was called up to the Algerian Under-23 national team for a friendly against Qatar. On 12 October, he made his debut starting in the game, with Algeria winning 1-0.

References

External links

Eliteprospects Profile

1990 births
Swedish footballers
Sweden youth international footballers
Algerian footballers
Algeria under-23 international footballers
Footballers from Stockholm
Swedish people of Algerian descent
Swedish sportspeople of African descent
Vejle Boldklub players
IF Brommapojkarna players
Danish Superliga players
Expatriate men's footballers in Denmark
Living people
Allsvenskan players
IK Sirius Fotboll players
Association football midfielders